Michael Joseph Rodrigues was a five-time national table tennis champion of Pakistan winning the National Boys Singles in 1956 and the Men's Singles in 1957, 1958, 1960, 1961 and 1962. In 1962 he was also the Captain of the Pakistan Team at the Asian Table Tennis Championships in Bombay, India.
In 1963 he also participated in the Far East Championship.

Education
Of Goan origin, he was educated at St. Patrick's High School, Karachi. He graduated with a medical degree from Dow Medical College, Karachi, in 1965.

Later life
Rodrigues later became a general surgeon and migrated to the USA. He was first licensed to practice through a California license in voluntary service in 1974. He has admitting privileges at Alvarado Hospital, San Diego.

References

Pakistani Roman Catholics
St. Patrick's High School, Karachi alumni
Pakistani male table tennis players
Pakistani surgeons
Racket sportspeople from Karachi
Living people
Pakistani emigrants to the United States
Pakistani people of Goan descent
Dow Medical College alumni
Year of birth missing (living people)
American people of Goan descent
People with acquired American citizenship